Brendan Hugh Francis Murray (born 16 November 1996) is an Irish singer and former member of the Irish boy band HomeTown. He represented Ireland in the Eurovision Song Contest 2017 with the song "Dying to Try" but failed to qualify for the final. He then competed in The X Factor (UK) in 2018, finishing fifth.

Life and career
Brendan was born in Tuam, County Galway. He attended St Patrick's Primary School and St Jarlath's College, both in Tuam.

2014–2016: HomeTown

In 2014, Murray became a member of the Irish boy band HomeTown, managed by Louis Walsh. The band achieved three chart successes in its home country, including the number one singles "Where I Belong" in 2014, and "Cry for Help" in 2015. Their debut album, HomeTown, was released in November 2015 and peaked at number four in Ireland. In December 2016, the band announced that it was going on an indefinite hiatus.

2016–2017: Eurovision Song Contest
On 16 December 2016, Murray was announced as the Irish representative in the Eurovision Song Contest 2017.
His song, "Dying to Try", was released on 10 March 2017. He didn't reach the final, placing 13th out of the 18 contestants; only the top ten finishers were qualified.

2018: The X Factor
In 2018, Murray entered Season 15 of The X Factor UK. During the Six Chair challenge he received a safe seat from One Direction singer Louis Tomlinson, its first recipient, on the way to the live shows. He sang "Break Free" by Ariana Grande for his first X Factor live performance, with a 'This Is Me' theme. The second week, 'Guilty Pleasure' week, Murray sang "Believe" by Cher. On Sunday's results show, he was in the bottom three to compete in the sing-off. He was given equal votes by the judges, along with LMA Choir. The result went to deadlock, reverting to the earlier public votes. LMA Choir had the fewest votes and Brendan was saved and continued to the next week. On the third week of 'Fright Night', Murray performed "Youngblood" by 5 Seconds of Summer. During Week 4, he sang "Everybody Hurts" by R.E.M. for 'Movie Week'. He was eliminated in the semifinal on the Saturday show after he received the fewest votes from the public along with Danny Tetley, finishing in fifth place.

2021-present

In January 2022, Murray was announced as one of 6 participants in the running to represent Ireland in the Eurovision Song Contest 2022 in Turin, Italy. His song "Real Love" was written over lockdown by Murray and Darrell Coyle. He finished in 6th place (last place) with 12 points.

Discography

Singles

References

External links

1996 births
Eurovision Song Contest entrants of 2017
Eurovision Song Contest entrants for Ireland
Irish pop singers
Living people
People educated at St Jarlath's College
People from Tuam
The X Factor (British TV series) contestants
21st-century Irish male  singers